Elachista obtusella is a moth in the family Elachistidae. It was described by Sruoga in 2008. It is found in Nepal. The habitat consists of pine forests.

The wingspan is about 7.2 mm. The forewings are pale greyish brown, mottled by brownish grey tipped scales. There are dark brown scales beyond the middle of the wing, forming two irregular spots near the costal and tornal margins. The same scales are found in the apical area, where they form an elongate spot. The hindwings are dark brown. Adults have been recorded on wing in early March.

Etymology
The species name refers to the peculiarly blunt apex of the saccus and is derived from Latin obtusus (meaning blunt, dull).

References

Moths described in 2008
obtusella
Moths of Asia